Giorgi Nareklishvili (born 6 March 1993) is a Georgian former cyclist. He has been the national road race champion of Georgia five times and time trial champion once.

Major results
Source: 

2012
 National Road Championships
2nd Time trial
3rd Road race
2013
 National Road Championships
1st  Road race
2nd Time trial
2014
 National Road Championships
1st  Road race
2nd Time trial
 National Track Championships
1st  Individual pursuit
1st  Kilo
2015
 National Road Championships
1st  Road race
1st  Under-23 road race
1st  Time trial
1st  Under-23 time trial
2016
 National Road Championships
1st  Road race
2nd Time trial
 8th Overall Tour of Ankara
2017
 National Road Championships
1st  Road race
2nd Time trial

References

External links

1993 births
Living people
Male cyclists from Georgia (country)
Cyclists at the 2015 European Games
European Games competitors for Georgia (country)